Anatolie Prepeliță (born 6 August 1997) is a Moldovan professional footballer who plays for Chattanooga FC and the Moldova national team, as a defender.

Football career
Prepeliță made his professional debut for Zimbru in the Divizia Națională on 29 April 2016 against Speranța Nisporeni, coming on as a 93rd-minute substitute in a 1–0 win.

International
He made his Moldova national football team debut on 11 October 2019 in a Euro 2020 qualifier against Andorra. He started the game and played the whole match as Moldova lost 0–1.

Notes

References

External links
  

1997 births
Living people
Moldovan footballers
Moldova under-21 international footballers
Moldova international footballers
FC Zimbru Chișinău players
FK Spartaks Jūrmala players
Moldovan Super Liga players
Latvian Higher League players
Moldovan expatriate footballers
Expatriate footballers in Latvia
Moldovan expatriate sportspeople in Latvia
Association football defenders